Storm Riders is a 1982 film by David Lourie, Jack McCoy and Dick Hoole, featuring some of the world's best surfers and the world's champion windsurfers. The film was produced by "Hoole/McCoy Films" in association with "Rip Curl Wetsuits", and "L.K. Communications".

The documentary was filmed in Sumatra, Java, Bali, Africa, Hawaii and Australia.

Storm Riders was digitally remastered and re-released in 2007 to celebrate the movie's 25th anniversary.

Featured Riders

Surfer – Wayne 'Rabbit' Bartholomew
Surfer – Gerry Lopez
Surfer – Mark Richards
Surfer – Wayne Lynch
Surfer – Joe Engel
Surfer – Peter McCabe
Surfer – Simon Anderson
Surfer – Shaun Thomson
Surfer – Thornton Fallander
Surfer – Tommy Carroll
Surfer – Soeda_Hiromitch
Surfer – Tako Misao
Windsurfer – Robbie Naish

Soundtrack
LP EMI EMX-112
Film soundtrack compiled by Hugh Rule and Brett Goldsmith.

Track Listing: (Aus)
 "The Unloved One" instrumental performed by INXS 

 "Summer of 81" performed by Mondo Rock
 "Hard Act to Follow" performed by Split Enz
 "Bustin' Loose" performed by Moving Pictures
 "Life Speeds Up" performed by The Church
 "Local and/or General" performed by Models
 "Unpublished Critics" performed by Australian Crawl
 "Cool Change" performed by Little River Band
 "Tunnel of Love" performed by Sunnyboys
 "Hit & Run" performed by Jo Jo Zep & The Falcons
 "Asian Paradise" performed by Sharon O'Neil
 "Hot Cover" performed by Matt Finish
 "I'm Not Like Everybody Else" performed by Jimmy & The Boys
 "Falling" performed by Mark Gillespie

Track Listing: (US version)

 "Hard Act to Follow" performed by Split Enz
 "Summer of 81" performed by Mondo Rock
 "Life Speeds Up" performed by The Church
 "Look at Me" performed by Matt Finish
 "Big City Talk" performed by Marc Hunter
 "Unpublished Critics" performed by Australian Crawl
 "Gay Guys" performed by The Dugites
 "This Is the Ritz" performed by N Z Pop
 "People" performed by Mi-Sex
 "I'm Not Like Everybody Else" performed by Jimmy & The Boys
 "Local and/or General" performed by Models
 "Albert of India" performed by Split Enz

Charts

References

External links
 
 Jack McCoy Films
 Digitally re-mastered trailer for Storm Riders
 

1982 films
Documentary films about surfing
Australian surfing films
1980s English-language films
Australian sports documentary films